Unser Walter is a German television series.

See also
List of German television series

External links
 

1974 German television series debuts
1974 German television series endings
German drama television series
German-language television shows
ZDF original programming